Siphonochilus kilimanensis is a species of plant in the ginger family, Zingiberaceae. It was first described by François Gagnepain and renamed by Brian Laurence Burtt.

References 

kilimanensis